Waissman is a documentary film by Eduardo Montes-Bradley featuring the life and works of Argentine artist Andrés Waissman. The film was entirely shot in Palermo a district of Buenos Aires where Andrés Waissman and his wife, art-dealer Gachi Prieto, live and work.

Waissman was produced by Heritage Film Project as part of series of biographical portraits on contemporary artists from the Americas. The series included previous portraits of Calzada, Ernesto Deira, Pérez Celis, and John Borden Evans.

Waissman premiered on November 23, 2010, on WPBT Channel 2 (PBS), and shown at the Museo de Arte Latinoamericano de Buenos Aires (MALBA) on November 26, 2010.

Synopsis

From the intimacy of his atelier in the suburbs of Buenos Aires, Andrés Waissman reveals the complex circumstances that contributed to shape his life-time canvas.  The fundamental theme of his focus are multitudes, displacement, exodus, ships and migrants, and the diaspora of Jewish in search of the Promised Land.  The theme of human tragedy, and Human Rights coexists with the unreal or surreal universe of mythological mammoths, and other fascinating creatures. The attempts to reveal the relationship between the creator and his creatures.

HD | 30 min. | English
Distributed by Alexander Street Press and Kanopy

References

External links
  
 Amazon.com  
 Idoneos  
 Vimeo Screening 

2010 television films
2010 films
American independent films
Documentary films about painters
Films set in Buenos Aires
Films directed by Eduardo Montes-Bradley
American short documentary films
2010 short documentary films
2010s English-language films
2010s American films